During World War II, the United States Army Air Forces (USAAF) established numerous airfields in South Carolina for antisubmarine defense in the Gulf of Mexico and for training pilots and aircrews of USAAF fighters and bombers.

Most of these airfields were under the command of Third Air Force or the Army Air Forces Training Command (AAFTC) (A predecessor of the current-day United States Air Force Air Education and Training Command).  However the other USAAF support commands (Air Technical Service Command (ATSC) and Air Transport Command (ATC) maintained a large base in Charleston.

It is still possible to find remnants of these wartime airfields. Many were converted into municipal airports, some were returned to agriculture and several were retained as United States Air Force installations and were front-line bases during the Cold War. Hundreds of the temporary buildings that were used survive today, and are being used for other purposes.

Major Airfields

Multiple Commands
 421st Base HQ and Air Base Squadron 
 Initially: Air Technical Service Command (29th Air Base Group, Distribution Point #2)  
 Also used by: Army Air Forces Antisubmarine Command (16th Antisubmarine Squadron)
 Later: Transferred to: First Air Force (113th AAF Base Unit)
 Later: Transferred to: Air Transport Command (593d AAF Base Unit)
 Later: Charleston Air Force Base (1952-2010)
 Now:  Joint Base Charleston (2010-Present)

Third Air Force

 Sub-base of: Morris Army Airfield, North Carolina
 359th Army Air Force Base Unit 
 Later: Aiken Air Force Station (1955-1975)
 Now: Aiken Municipal Airport 

 309th/329th Bombardment Group, 329th AAF Base Unit 
 Also used by: Army Air Forces Antisubmarine Command 
 Later: Transferred to First Air Force
 129th Army Air Force Base Unit
 Known sub-bases and auxiliaries
 Barnwell Army Airfield
 Johns Island Army Airfield
 North Army Airfield
 Walterboro Army Airfield 
 Now: Columbia Metropolitan Airport 

 Later: Transferred to First Air Force
 Known sub-bases and auxiliaries
 Coronaca Army Airfield
 Anderson Auxiliary Field
 Later: Donaldson Air Force Base (1947-1963)
 Now: Donaldson Center Airport 

 Later: Transferred to: United States Marine Corps
 Now:   McEntire Joint National Guard Base 

 Later: Transferred to First Air Force
 Known sub-bases and auxiliaries
 Hartsville Army Airfield
 Hartsville Auxiliary Field
 Now: Florence Regional Airport   i

 Later: Myrtle Beach Army Airfield
 519th Army Air Force Base Unit
 Later: Transferred to First Air Force
 136th Army Air Force Base Unit
 Known sub-bases and auxiliaries
 Ocean Drive Flight Strip
 Later:  Myrtle Beach Air Force Base (1956-1993)
 Now: Myrtle Beach International Airport

AAF Training Command
Eastern Flight Training Center
 Army Air Force Flying School (Basic)
 Known sub-bases and auxiliaries
 Burt Gin Auxiliary Field
 Rembert Auxiliary Field
 Monaghan Auxiliary Field
 Sumter Municipal Airport
 Now:  Shaw Air Force Base

AAF Contract Flying Schools

 Southern Airways Contract Glider Pilot Training School (1941-1943)
 Later: Transferred to: Air Technical Service Command (1943-1945)
 529th Army Air Force Base Unit
 Joint Civil/USAAF Use
 Now: Greenville Downtown Airport 

 Georgia Air Service, Inc & Southeastern Air Service, Inc.
 Now: Marlboro County Jetport 

 Free French Air Force pilot training
 58th Flying Training Detachment
 Known sub-bases and auxiliaries
 Jennings Auxiliary Field
 Hagood Auxiliary Field
 Kennedy Auxiliary Field
 Now: Non-aviation use

 
 Southern Aviation School

Minor Airfields

 Preflight cadet pilot screening  
 Now: Non-aviation use

 Used for training of observation pilots (3d AF); supported Fort Jackson; US Navy use.
 Now: Jim Hamilton – L.B. Owens Airport 

 Auxiliary fighter pilot training field
 Abandoned 1983
 Undetermined usage by AAF
 Abandoned, undetermined history 

 Likely Emergency landing airfield
 Abandoned approx 1965.  

 Joint Civil/USAAF airfield; supported Army Camp Croft Infantry Replacement Training Center
 Transferred to: United States Navy 1943
 (IATA: SPA, ICAO: KSPA, FAA LID: SPA)

References

 Maurer, Maurer (1983). Air Force Combat Units Of World War II. Maxwell AFB, Alabama: Office of Air Force History. .
 Ravenstein, Charles A. (1984). Air Force Combat Wings Lineage and Honors Histories 1947-1977. Maxwell AFB, Alabama: Office of Air Force History. .
 Thole, Lou (1999), Forgotten Fields of America : World War II Bases and Training, Then and Now - Vol. 2.  Pictorial Histories Pub . 
 Military Airfields in World War II - South Carolina

External links

 01
World War II
Airfields of the United States Army Air Forces in the United States by state
United States World War II army airfields